David Kyreem Bell (born December 14, 2000) is an American football wide receiver for the Cleveland Browns of the National Football League (NFL). He played college football at Purdue.

Early years
Bell grew up in Indianapolis, Indiana and attended Warren Central High School. As a junior, Bell recorded 52 catches for 1,075 yards and 11 touchdowns. He was also a member of Warren Central's undefeated Class 4A State Championship Basketball team. As a senior, Bell caught 85 passes for 1,542 yards and 22 touchdowns and was named the Marion County Athlete of the Year and Male Athlete of the Year by The Indianapolis Star as well as the Indiana Gatorade Player of the Year as the Warriors went on to win the 6A State Title. Rated the best recruit in Indiana by several outlets, Bell committed to play college football at Purdue over offers from Penn State and Ohio State during the All-American Bowl.

College career
Bell became a starter at wide receiver as a true freshman. Bell was named the Big Ten Conference Freshman of the Week four times, including after catching nine passes for 138 yards and two touchdowns on October 12, 2019, against Maryland. He finished the season with 86 receptions for 1,035 yards and seven touchdowns and was named the Big Ten Freshman of the Year.

Bell was named the Big Ten co-Offensive Player of the Week for the first week of his sophomore season after catching 13 passes for 121 yards and three touchdowns in a 24-20 win over Iowa. He was named first-team All-Big Ten after catching 53 passes for 625 yards and eight touchdowns over six games in the team's COVID-19-shortened 2020 season. As a junior, Bell repeated as a first-team All-Big Ten selection and the Richter–Howard Receiver of the Year. He was named as a Consensus All-American for 2021.

College statistics

Professional career

Bell was selected by the Cleveland Browns with the 99th overall pick in the third round of the 2022 NFL Draft. He finished his rookie season with 24 receptions for 214 receiving yards in 16 games and three starts.

References

External links

Cleveland Browns bio
Purdue Boilermakers bio

2000 births
Living people
American football wide receivers
Purdue Boilermakers football players
Players of American football from Indianapolis
All-American college football players
Cleveland Browns players